Come to Life is the first studio album by American hip hop musician Cities Aviv. It was released on Young One Records on January 28, 2014. Music videos were created for "URL IRL" and "Don't Ever Look Back".

Reception
At Metacritic, which assigns a weighted average score out of 100 to reviews from mainstream critics, Come to Life received an average score of 78% based on 6 reviews, indicating "generally favorable reviews".

Pat Levy of Consequence of Sound said: "Whereas Cities Aviv's last few records have been more sonically challenging, this one flies by with the strongest cohesion of Mays' shout-rap style and the genre-bending production that he consistently finds himself on." Brandon Soderberg of Spin noted that "Burzum-esque screams tear through these noise-damaged dance-rap tracks about the pros and cons of the coming singularity." David Jeffries of AllMusic described it as "an inspired, stick-to-the-bones album that offers a surprising amount of comfort, uplift, and new opportunities."

Track listing

References

External links

Cities Aviv albums
2014 debut albums